This is a list of mountain ranges in the Madrean Sky Islands ecoregion within the Sonoran and Chihuahuan Deserts of the Southwestern United States and northwestern Mexico. The list is presented both alphabetically and by political territory. The elevation (in feet) of the highest point in each range is indicated in parentheses.

Alphabetical list

Animas Mountains (8565)—Hidalgo County, New Mexico
Atascosa Mountains (6440)—Santa Cruz County, Arizona
Baboquivari Mountains (Arizona) (7730)—Pima County, Arizona
Chiricahua Mountains (9759)—Cochise County, Arizona
Dos Cabezas Mountains (8354)—Cochise County, Arizona
Dragoon Mountains (7512)—Cochise County, Arizona
Galiuro Mountains (7663)—Cochise, Graham, and Gila counties, Arizona)
Guadalupe Mountains (5280)—Hidalgo County, New Mexico, and Cochise County, Arizona
Huachuca Mountains (9466)—Cochise and Santa Cruz counties, Arizona, and Sonora, Mexico
Little Dragoon Mountains (6588)—Cochise County, Arizona
Little Rincon Mountains (6114)—Cochise and Pima counties, Arizona
Mule Mountains (7370)—Cochise County, Arizona
Mustang Mountains (6440)—Santa Cruz County, Arizona
Pajarito Mountains (5236)—Santa Cruz County, Arizona
Patagonia Mountains (7221)—Santa Cruz County, Arizona
Pedrogosa Mountains ( ? )—Cochise County, Arizona
Peloncillo Mountains (Cochise County) (5551)—Cochise, Graham, and Greenlee counties, Arizona
Peloncillo Mountains (Hidalgo County) (6928)—Hidalgo County, New Mexico
Perilla Mountains ( ? )—Cochise County, Arizona
Pinal Mountains (7848)—Gila County, Arizona
Pinaleño Mountains (10720)—Graham County, Arizona
Pozo Verde Mountains (4885)—Pima County, Arizona
Quinlan Mountains (5014)—Pima County, Arizona
Rincon Mountains (8664)—Pima County, Arizona
San Cayento Mountains (6007)—Santa Cruz County, Arizona
San Luis Mountains (5369)—Pima County, Arizona
Santa Catalina Mountains (9157)—Pima and Pinal counties, Arizona
Santa Rita Mountains (8585)—Santa Cruz and Pima counties, Arizona
Santa Teresa Mountains (8282)—Graham County, Arizona
Sierra del Tigre (7742)—Sonora, Mexico
Sierra La Esmeralda ( ? )—Sonora, Mexico
Sierra San Antonio ( ? )—Santa Cruz County, Arizona, and Sonora, Mexico
Sierra San Jose ( ? )—Sonora, Mexico
Sierra San Luis (8144)—Sonora and Chihuahua, Mexico
Sierrita Mountains (6188)—Pima County, Arizona
Swisshelm Mountains (7185)—Cochise County, Arizona
Tortolita Mountains (4652)—Pima County, Arizona
Tumacácori Mountains (5606)—Santa Cruz County, Arizona
Whetstone Mountains (7711)—Cochise County, Arizona
Winchester Mountains ( ? )—Cochise County, Arizona

Mexico

Chihuahua

Sierra San Luis

Sonora

Huachuca Mountains
Sierra del Tigre
Sierra La Esmeralda
Sierra San Antonio
Sierra San Jose
Sierra San Luis

United States

Arizona

Cochise County

Chiricahua Mountains
Dos Cabezas Mountains
Dragoon Mountains
Galiuro Mountains
Guadalupe Mountains
Huachuca Mountains
Little Dragoon Mountains
Little Rincon Mountains
Mule Mountains
Pedrogosa Mountains
Peloncillo Mountains (Cochise County)
Perilla Mountains
Swisshelm Mountains
Whetstone Mountains
Winchester Mountains

Gila County

Galiuro Mountains
Pinal Mountains

Graham County

Galiuro Mountains
Peloncillo Mountains (Cochise County)
Pinaleño Mountains
Santa Teresa Mountains

Greenlee County

Peloncillo Mountains (Cochise County)

Pima County

Baboquivari Mountains (Arizona)
Little Rincon Mountains
Pozo Verde Mountains
Quinlan Mountains
Rincon Mountains
San Luis Mountains
Santa Catalina Mountains
Santa Rita Mountains
Sierrita Mountains
Tortolita Mountains

Pinal County

Santa Catalina Mountains

Santa Cruz County

Atascosa Mountains
Huachuca Mountains
Mustang Mountains
Pajarito Mountains
Patagonia Mountains
San Cayetano Mountains
Santa Rita Mountains
Sierra San Antonio
Tumacácori Mountains

New Mexico

Hidalgo County

Animas Mountains
Guadalupe Mountains
Peloncillo Mountains (Hidalgo County)

See also

Madrean Region
List of mountain ranges of the Sonoran Desert
List of mountain ranges of Arizona
List of mountain ranges of New Mexico

 •
Madrean Sky Islands, Ranges
Madrean Sky Islands, Ranges
Madrean Sky Islands, Ranges
Madrean Ski Island mountain ranges, List of
.
.
Madrean Sky Islands, Ranges
Madrean Sky Islands, Ranges
Madrean
Madrean
Madrean
Madrean Sky Islands, Ranges